Alois Hannecker (born 10 July 1961) is a retired (West) German discus thrower.

Hannecker represented the sports clubs MTV Ingolstadt and LC Olympiapark München, and became West German champion in 1986 and 1987. His personal best throw was 65.90 metres, achieved in May 1988 in Bensheim.

Achievements

References

1961 births
Living people
German male discus throwers
Athletes (track and field) at the 1988 Summer Olympics
Olympic athletes of West Germany